Parinari capensis, the sand apple, is a species of flowering plant in the family Chrysobalanaceae, found in Botswana, DRC, Mozambique, Namibia, South Africa, Tanzania and Zimbabwe. The leaves are elliptic with a white underside. It has small white flowers and a hairy sand-coloured calyx.

Habitat

It blooms from September to October. The species is considered a geoxyle with a substantial part of the plant growing under the ground, an adaptation to fire-prone habitats. They have been considered therefore as forming immortal underground forests of great age.

Uses
The plant is used for anti-malaria purposes.

References

External links
Parinari capensis

capensis
Geoxyles